The Welaka National Fish Hatchery, operated by the U.S. Fish and Wildlife Service, is a warmwater hatchery. The only national fish hatchery in Florida, it has two units, both of which are near the town of Welaka.

History
The state of Florida built the hatchery in 1926, running it for over a decade. The facilities were turned over to the U.S. government in 1938, who have been in charge since then.

The hatchery
The headquarters for the hatchery is called the Welaka Unit. A nearby aquarium is operated by the Unit, with samples of fish that the hatchery raises.

Approximately three miles to the south is the Beecher Unit, named after the spring that provides water for the fish ponds there. It has an observation tower with interpretive information, as well as a small picnic area and nature trail.

References

Landmarks in Florida
National Fish Hatcheries of the United States
Buildings and structures in Putnam County, Florida
Tourist attractions in Putnam County, Florida
Agricultural buildings and structures in Florida
1926 establishments in Florida